Osterbach may refer to:

 Osterbach (Biber), a river of Bavaria, Germany, tributary of the Biber
 Osterbach (Eder), a river of Hesse, Germany, tributary of the Eder
 Osterbach (Fulda), a river of Hesse, Germany, tributary of the Fulda
 Osterbach (Gersprenz), a river of Hesse, Germany, headwater of the Gersprenz